Carolina Coastal Railway  is a shortline railroad that operates several lines in North Carolina and one line in South Carolina.

History
CLNA was created in 1989 under the Thoroughbred Shortline Program of Norfolk Southern and was a subsidiary of Rail Link, Inc., which became a subsidiary of Genesee & Wyoming in 1995. CLNA interchanged with NS at Pinetown. CLNA was acquired by Main Line Rail Management, Inc. in 2003.

In 2006, CLNA began to serve a former NS branch between Whitney and Badin where Alcoa previously operated a large aluminum plant.

On March 25, 2007, CLNA entered into a lease agreement with NS for the Plymouth-Raleigh route, 147 miles of the former mainline of the original Norfolk Southern. 

In 2010, CLNA began providing contract switching services in Kinston, North Carolina. Also in 2011, CLNA began serving the Port of Morehead City by taking over the Morehead and South Fork.

In 2011, CLNA purchased a line between Rocky Mount and Spring Hope previously known as the Nash County Railroad. Also in 2011, CLNA began operating a former NS branch between Blacksburg, South Carolina and Kings Creek, South Carolina; operations on this branch ceased in 2013.

In 2020, the railroad was purchased by Regional Rail.

See also

Thoroughbred Shortline Program

References

External links
Official website
Railway Association of North Carolina - CLNA
American Short Line & Regional Railroad Association: CLNA

North Carolina railroads
Genesee & Wyoming
Spin-offs of the Norfolk Southern Railway